The name Douglas has been used for seven tropical cyclones in the Eastern Pacific Ocean.
 Hurricane Douglas (1984) – strongest hurricane of the season, never threatened land
 Tropical Storm Douglas (1990) – killed one person in Mexico, where it nearly made landfall
 Hurricane Douglas (1996) – continuation of Hurricane Cesar in the Atlantic, crossed Central America and became Hurricane Douglas
 Hurricane Douglas (2002) – never threatened land 
 Tropical Storm Douglas (2008) – passed near Mexico, brought minor flooding to some areas
 Tropical Storm Douglas (2014) – never threatened land 
 Hurricane Douglas (2020) –  passed very close to Hawaii at hurricane strength 

Pacific hurricane set index articles